The 2010-11 NBL Indonesia is the first season of NBL Indonesia, a nationwide basketball competition which previously known as Indonesian Basketball League (IBL).

Participating teams

Competition format
Participating teams compete in the regular season using home tournament format. The regular season divided into 5 series, each with different host cities. The top teams in final overall standings will continue to the championship playoffs.

There is also a pre-season warm-up tournament held before the regular season.

Regular season

Standings

Updated to games played on 13 February 2011.

Playoffs

Bracket
All matches were played in DBL Arena Surabaya, East Java.

Game Info

Quarterfinals

Semifinals

3rd place game

Final

References

2010-11
2010–11 in Asian basketball leagues
NBL